also known as "Shirotori" is a 1965 Japanese jidaigeki film directed by Toshio Masuda. The film is the first film to be released from Yūjirō Ishihara's company Ishihara Promotion.

Based on Shōtarō Ikenami's novel "Shiro wo Toru Hanashi".

Plot
At the end of the Sengoku period, While other Daimyo are joining Tokugawa Ieyasu's army one after another. but only Uesugi clan is brave enough stand in Ieyasu's way. Kuruma Touzo is a ronin who left Kobayakawa Hideaki. He is impressed by the Uesugi clan's courage and tries to help. His target is Tamonyama castle under construction by Date clan.

Cast

References

External links

Nikkatsu films
Jidaigeki films
Samurai films
1960s Japanese films